North West is a province of South Africa. Its capital is Mahikeng. The province is located to the west of the major population centre of Gauteng and south of Botswana.

History
North West was incorporated after the end of Apartheid in 1994, and includes parts of the former Transvaal Province and Cape Province, as well as most of the former bantustan of Bophuthatswana. It was the scene of political violence in Khutsong, Merafong City Local Municipality in 2006 and 2007, after cross-province municipalities were abolished and Merafong Municipality was transferred entirely to North West. Merafong has since been transferred to Gauteng province in 2009.

This province is the birthplace of prominent political figures: Lucas Mangope, Moses Kotane, Ahmed Kathrada, Abram Onkgopotse Tiro, Ruth Mompati, J. B. Marks, Aziz Pahad, Essop Pahad and others.

Law and government
The provincial government consists of a premier, an executive council of ten ministers, and a legislature. The provincial assembly and premier are elected for five-year terms, or until the next national election. Political parties are awarded assembly seats based on the percentage of votes each party receives in the province during the national elections. The assembly elects a premier, who then appoints the members of the executive council.

The premier of North West Province as of 7 September 2021 is Bushy Maape of the African National Congress. He replaced Job Mokgoro as premier after Mokgoro resigned in August 2021.

Geography

Much of the province consists of flat areas of scattered trees and grassland. The Magaliesberg mountain range in the northeast extends about 130 km (about 80 miles) from Pretoria to Rustenburg. The Vaal River flows along the southern border of the province.

Climate
Temperatures range from 17° to 31 °C (62° to 88 °F) in the summer and from 3° to 21 °C (37° to 70 °F) in the winter. Annual rainfall totals about 360 mm (about 14 in), with almost all of it falling during the summer months, between October and April.

Borders
North West borders the following districts of Botswana:
Kgatleng – far northeast
South-East – northeast
Southern – north
Kgalagadi – northwest
Domestically, it borders the following provinces:
Limpopo – northeast
Gauteng – east
Free State – southeast
Northern Cape – southwest

North West Province is traversed by the northwesterly line of equal latitude and longitude.

Municipalities

The North West Province is divided into four district municipalities. The district municipalities are in turn divided into 18 local municipalities:

District municipalities

Bojanala Platinum District
Moretele
Madibeng
Rustenburg
Kgetlengrivier
Moses Kotane
Dr Ruth Segomotsi Mompati District
Naledi
Mamusa
Greater Taung
Kagisano-Molopo
Lekwa-Teemane
Ngaka Modiri Molema District
Mahikeng
Ratlou
Tswaing
Ditsobotla
Ramotshere
Dr Kenneth Kaunda District
JB Marks
Matlosana
Maquassi Hills

Cities and towns
Population 200,000+

Population 50,000+
 Potchefstroom

Population 25,000+

Population 10,000+

Population < 10,000

Economy

The mainstay of the economy of North West Province is mining, which generates more than half of the province's gross domestic product and provides jobs for a quarter of its workforce. The chief minerals are gold, mined at Orkney and Klerksdorp; uranium, mined at Klerksdorp; platinum, mined at Rustenburg and Brits; and diamonds, mined at Lichtenburg, Christiana, and Bloemhof. About 85% of all money-making activities take place between Klerksdorp and Potchefstroom. The economic heart of the province is Klerksdorp. The northern and western parts of the province have many sheep farms and cattle and game ranches. The eastern and southern parts are crop-growing regions that produce maize (corn), sunflowers, tobacco, cotton, and citrus fruits. The entertainment and casino complex at Sun City and Lost City also contributes to the provincial economy.

Demographics

The majority of the province's residents are Tswana people who speak Tswana, as in neighbouring Botswana. Smaller groups include Afrikaans, Sotho, and Xhosa speaking people. English is spoken primarily as a second language. Most of the population belong to Christian denominations. (Figures according to Census 2001 released in July 2003).

According to the 2007 community survey 90.8% of the province's population was Black (mostly Tswana-speaking), 7.2% as White (mostly Afrikaans speaking), 1.6% as Coloured and 0.4% as Asian. The 2007 community survey showed the province had a population of just over 3 million. The province's white population is very unevenly distributed. In the southern and eastern municipalities, the white percentage in double figures such as the Tlokwe and Matlosana where the white percentages were 27% and 12% respectively.

The province has the lowest number of people aged 35 years and older (5.9%) who have received higher education. Since 1994 the number of people receiving higher education has increased. After the disbanding of the bantustans, many people migrated to the economic centres of Cape Town and Gauteng.

Education
The province had two universities: the University of North West, which was formerly called the University of Bophuthatswana (founded in 1979), in Mmabatho; and Potchefstroom University for Christian Higher Education (founded in 1869; became a constituent college of the University of South Africa in 1921 and an independent university in 1951). These two universities have now merged and the new institution is called North-West University.

As part of the Department of Education's proposed plans for higher education, the existing four higher learning institutions will be merged to form two. During 2003, as part of the Year of Further Education and Training project, three mega institutions, Taletso, ORBIT and Vuselela, were established to provide technical and vocational training to the youth. These institutions have been incorporated into many of the former education and technical colleges and manpower centres.

Sports
Basketball
North West Eagles (Potchefstroom)
Rugby union
Platinum Leopards (Rustenburg)
Soccer
Platinum Stars (dissolved) (Rustenburg)
Netball
North West Flames (Potchefstroom) 
Softball
Generations Softball club (Klerksdorp)

See also
 List of cities and towns in the North West Province
 List of speakers of the North West Provincial Legislature
 Provinces of South Africa

References

External links

North West Provincial Government
North West Parks and Tourism Board

 
Provinces of South Africa
States and territories established in 1994
1994 establishments in South Africa